Oriental Hotel may refer to:

Oriental Hotel (Kobe, Japan) - opened in 1870
Oriental Hotel, Manhattan Beach, New York, opened in 1880
Eastern & Oriental Hotel, in Georgetown, Malaysia- opened in 1885
Grand Oriental Hotel, Colombo, Sri Lanka - opened in 1875
Mandarin Oriental Group - organized in 1963
Mandarin Oriental Hotel, Bangkok - opened in 1876

See also
 Orient Hotel (disambiguation)